Corvallis High School (CHS) is a four-year public secondary school in Corvallis, Oregon.  Originally established in 1910, the high school sat between the downtown area of Corvallis and Oregon State University. In 1935, a new school was built on what was then considered the far northern edge of the town on approximately 25 acres. In 2005, a third structure was built on the site of the former one in what is now considered a central part of the city. Corvallis High School is one of two traditional secondary schools in the Corvallis School District, the other being Crescent Valley High School on the northern edge of the city.

Building

1910 structure
The original Corvallis High School was opened in February 1910 on 6th Street between Monroe Avenue and Madison Avenue, becoming the first dedicated high school in Corvallis.  Prior to the construction, all grades were housed in Corvallis Central School, which was built in 1889 and was located one block west on 7th Street. The new high school was built in an Arts and Crafts style. The structure was built of masonry and featured two stories on top of a daylight basement.  After only one year open, administration had already decided that the school was not large enough.  A $40,000 bond measure was passed to expand the existing structure.

In 1917, an expanded and remodeled building was opened.  The Arts and Crafts styling from the original building did not remain with the remodel and was changed to a Beaux-Arts style facade.  The remodeled school had 22 classrooms as well as a gymnasium that doubled as an auditorium.

The schools population continued to grow.  In 1920 a two-room portable classroom was added.  In the 1930s, Corvallis High School had reached a population of 650 students in a structure that was intended for 400.  It was decided that a larger school was needed.

When the 1935 high school opened, the 1910 building was converted to use as the junior high school until it was destroyed by fire in 1946.

1935 structure
In 1933, the citizens of Corvallis passed a local bond to pay for the construction.  This allowed the school district to apply for a Public Works Administration grant and loan, which was awarded in January 1934. The Portland firm of Whitehouse, Stanton, and Church was selected to design the new school.  The Corvallis School District selected the site for the new high school on 11th Street, on the far northwest edge of town. The new Art Deco structure was completed in 1935.  The project cost $316,000.  The building was expanded multiple times in the 50s and 60s, with the addition of the science and library wing as well as the cafeteria and a large gym addition.

In the spring of 2000, after the district finished a seismic analysis of its 17 schools, it was decided that the building was unsafe for student use. It was decided that the replacement should be built on the existing site, favoring the central location over the opportunity to gain more land at an alternative location. This decision also required the old building to be demolished, which upset some citizens who believed the building to be a historic treasure.

In an effort to save the structure, the building was nominated and added to the National Register of Historic Places in 2003. However, in the spring of 2004, construction began on the new building and the historic building was later demolished, and thus it was removed from the register.  Several small architectural items from the original school were salvaged and used in the new building, including two brass chandeliers from the school's original auditorium, and two wrought iron "Juliet"-style decorative balconies from the school's east-facing facade, which were integrated into the new theater.

2005 structure
After the seismic analysis in 2000, it was decided that a new high school needed to be built. The citizens of Corvallis passed an $86.4 million bond measure in 2002 to replace the high school as well as two middle schools, and also to update and renovate other schools in the district. Construction began in 2004 on the same lot as the second building in the old student parking lot, tennis courts, and football field/track, while classes continued in the old school. The second Corvallis High School structure was torn down in the summer of 2005 and was replaced with a softball field and a parking lot. The original front parking lot still remains, as well as several auxiliary buildings along Dixon Creek that were built in the 1960s.

This third Corvallis High School building, facing Buchanan Street, was opened in the fall of 2005. Originally slated to be opened in January 2006, construction was far enough along to allow the 2005-06 school year to start in the new structure while construction continued on-site until the spring of 2006. The cost of construction for the  school was $46 million, and it was designed by Dull Olsen Weekes Architects of Portland. Conscientious effort was made to build an energy-efficient, sustainable school, achieving a LEED silver rating for high performance buildings. The school is expected to use 30% less energy than one built to standard Oregon code.

Academics
In 2018, 89% of the school's seniors received a high school diploma. Of 327 students, 304 graduated, with only 23 dropping out.

Athletics
CHS is a member of the Mid-Willamette Conference, Class 5A in the Oregon School Activities Association (OSAA).

State championships
 Boys' cross country: 1965, 1966
 Football: 1970, 1978, 1979, 1983, and 2006
 Boys' soccer: 1995, 2009, 2018
 Girls' volleyball: 1979, 1980, 1981, 1983, 2018
 Boys' basketball: 1936, 1948, 1970, 1980, 1984, 2011, 2012
 Boys' swimming: 2011
 Wrestling: 1965, 1967
 Girls' alpine skiing: 2007
 Boys' baseball: 1971, 1986
 Boys' golf: 1942, 1943, 1944, 1950, 1962, 1965, 2010, 2011
 Girls' tennis: 1966, 2015, 2016, 2017, 2018, 2019
 Girls' track and field: 1990
 Choir: 2015, 2016, 2017
 Chess: 1972, 1977, 1979 (national championship)

Activities

Newspaper
The school's newspaper is called the High-O-Scope and was established in 1920.

Yearbook
The school's yearbook is the Chintimini.

FIRST Robotics
Founded by CHS students in time for the 2002 FIRST Robotics Competition season, Team 997 Spartan Robotics provides a hands-on program for high school students to learn about STEM in a competitive sports-like environment. In their 2002 rookie season, they won the rookie all-star award. Spartan Robotics was ranked fifth in the nation during the 2007 FIRST Championship at Atlanta, Georgia, after winning at both the Portland and Sacramento Regionals. Team 997 ranked first in the 2010 Autodesk Oregon regional competition, making it to Atlanta for a second time. The team also received the FIRST cooperation award at the 2012 Oregon regionals. In 2014 the team competed in four events, to district qualifiers which earned them a spot at the PNW District Championship where they further qualified to go to St. Louis to compete in the 2014 FIRST World championships a fourth time.

Clubs
The school has 27 clubs in which students can choose to participate. A full list is available on the school website.

Choir
The Corvallis High School choir program includes five choirs: Cantus, a non-audition tenor and bass ensemble; Altum, a non-audition treble choir; Meraki, an audition treble choir; Concert Choir, an audition choir for all voice parts; and Spartacapella, an a capella ensemble for all voice parts. Concert Choir won state championships in 2015, 2016, and 2017, and placed fifth in 2018.

Notable alumni
Corvallis High School has a number of notable alumni, including these:
 Brad Badger (class of 1993), former NFL offensive tackle/guard
 Sam Baker (class of 1949), former NFL running back, placekicker, and punter
 Brad Bird (class of 1975), animator, writer, and director (The Incredibles, The Iron Giant, Ratatouille)
 Meredith Brooks, singer, songwriter, and producer;  known for her hit song "Bitch" (peaked at No. 2 on the Billboard Hot 100 in 1997)
 Grace DeMoss, former professional golfer
 Christopher L. Eisgruber (class of 1979), legal scholar and President of Princeton University
 Jon Francis (class of 1982), former NFL running back
 Dave Gambee (class of 1954), former NBA small forward (1958 - 1970)
 Bob Gilder (class of 1969), professional golfer and currently a member of the Champions Tour
 Kevin Gregg (class of 1997), former MLB pitcher 
 Jon Krakauer (class of 1972), climber and author of Into Thin Air, Into the Wild, Eiger Dreams, and Under the Banner of Heaven
 Jay Locey (class of 1973), football coach, former head football coach of the Lewis & Clark Pioneers and Linfield College
 Hector Macpherson, Jr. (class of 1936), State Senator who authored the Oregon Land Conservation and Development Act of 1973
 Ben Masters (class of 1965), actor, best known for his portrayal of Julian Crane in daytime drama Passions
 Barbara Minty (class of 1971), Vogue top model of the 1970s and widow of actor Steve McQueen
 Rebecca Morris, broadcast, radio and print journalist, and The New York Times bestselling non-fiction author
 Sara Nelson (class of 1991), union leader and International President of the Association of Flight Attendants
 Don Reynolds (class of 1971), former MLB player
 Harold Reynolds (class of 1979), former MLB second baseman and former ESPN broadcaster; currently working for MLB.com
 Mike Riley (class of 1971), football coach, current head coach of USFL New Jersey Generals
 Isaac Seumalo (class of 2012), current NFL offensive guard who won Super Bowl LII with the Philadelphia Eagles
 Robb Thomas (class of 1985), former NFL wide receiver
 Carl Wieman (class of 1969), recipient  of the 2001 Nobel Prize in Physics for creation of the Bose-Einstein condensate
 Mike Zandofsky (class of 1983), former NFL offensive guard

References

External links
 
 A History of Corvallis High School
 High-O-Scope – student newspaper
 Official Corvallis High School robotics team website 

Buildings and structures in Corvallis, Oregon
Educational institutions established in 1910
High schools in Benton County, Oregon
Public high schools in Oregon
1910 establishments in Oregon
Education in Corvallis, Oregon